The 69171/69172 Surat–Bharuch MEMU is a MEMU train of the Indian Railways connecting  and  of Gujarat. It is currently being operated with 69171/69172 train numbers on a daily basis.

Service

69171/Surat–Bharuch MEMU has average speed of 42 km/hr and covers 59 km in 1 hrs 25 min.
69172/Bharuch–Surat MEMU has average speed of 35 km/hr and covers 59 km in 1 hrs 40 min.

Route 

Coach composition

The train consists of 20 MEMU rake coaches.

External links 

 69171/Surat–Bharuch MEMU
 69172/Bharuch–Surat MEMU

References 

Transport in Bharuch
Transport in Surat
Electric multiple units in Gujarat